Soccer is a 1982 video game published by Gamma Software.

Gameplay
Soccer is a sports game in which 2-4 players compete in an arcade-style game.

Reception
Allen Doum reviewed the game for Computer Gaming World, and stated that "The graphics are of the kind that leave George Plimpton flat. For those who like the arcade style sports games, these games fall short of what the computer is capable of. However, as two-player sports games, they can be exciting."

References

External links
1984 Software Encyclopedia from Electronic Games
Book of Atari Software 1983
Review in Electronic Games
Review in Antic

1982 video games
Association football video games
Atari 8-bit family games
Atari 8-bit family-only games
Video games developed in the United States